County Route 210 or County Road 210 may refer to:

 County Road 210 (St. Johns County, Florida)
 County Route 210 (Wayne County, New York)